John Francis Shirk (June 24, 1917 – November 11, 1993) was a professional American football end and defensive end in the National Football League (NFL). He played one season for the Chicago Cardinals. During World War II, he served as a captain in the field artillery. During the invasion of Salerno, he was captured and held in the German prisoner of war camp Oflag 64 in Poland.

External links

 

1917 births
1993 deaths
American football defensive ends
American football ends
Chicago Cardinals players
Oklahoma Sooners football players
United States Army personnel of World War II
American prisoners of war in World War II
United States Army officers
World War II prisoners of war held by Germany
Sportspeople from Oklahoma City
Players of American football from Oklahoma